Panki is a suburb of metropolitan Kanpur, India, situated about 12 km from Kanpur Central on the NH 2 to Delhi. The region is famous for Panki Temple and Panki Thermal Power Station which is among the few thermal energy units in Northern India. Panki is an industrial and resedential region and has recently seen large economic developments. The site is also famous for being the Logistics Hub in Kanpur region. Panki Logistics Park is among the largest logistics park of Northern India.
Rahul Chauhan is the famous personality of the area who appeared in mtv Roadies 2020

Travel
Roadways
Panki has a bus station and UPSRTC Buses of Kanpur have routes from Sachendi to different localities.

Panki is also starting point of Kanpur over-bridge which is one of the largest over-bridges in India.

Railways
Panki has a railway station on the Kanpur-Delhi line. Panki Railway station is set to be projected as terminal station for minimize the passenger load of Kanpur Central.

Airways
Kanpur Airport is nearest airport.

Tourist attractions

Panki is presently inside the Kanpur municipal limits and is about 12 km from the Kanpur railway station and main bus stand. The place has an electric power generating station, which supplies to the northern grid. While the place Bithoor is connected with Saint Valmiki this place Panki is linked to Hanuman. The place Panki has a wonderful ancient temple of Lord Hanuman.

The temple of Lord Hanuman

The temple of Lord Hanuman is one of the most popular temples in this region. It draws many devotees from all over the country. Built on a sprawling land with great elevation, and huge towering ‘kumbas’ are under construction. There are three entrances to the temple from East, North, and West sides and the temple is a magnificent sight from distance itself.

The History of the temple

Although no authentic evidence regarding the history of the temple is available, yet as per the legendary, temple is about three to four hundred years old and The temple had been founded by Mahant Sri Sri 1008 Purushottam Dasji Maharaj. Period mention is older than that of the rule of Raja Hindu Singh who laid the foundation of a village called ‘Kanhapur’ (present Kanpur) on the auspicious occasion of Janamashtami. As per public ascertainment, once upon a time Mahant Sri Sri 1008 Purushottam Dasji Maharaj was on a pilgrimage to Chitrakoot. Traveling on a bullock cart, near Chitrakoot Mahant stopped for his morning prayers and on finishing of his prayer and prepared to proceed on his journey, Mahant stumbled upon a rock like object. To his astonishment that was an idol of Lord Hanuman, and by divine intuition he felt that Lord Hanuman wanted him to carry the idol with him. Since he was proceeding towards the holy place Bithoor, the place where Saint Valmiki’s Ashram was there. Following this divine direction, Mahant picked up the idol, kept it in his bullock cart with all reverence and continued his journey towards Bithoor.

After some days of journey when the convoy was just ten koj (approx. 15 km) away from Bithoor, Mahant found that the bullock cart was not moving and the bullocks were finding the load of car heavy. Failing all efforts Mahant decided to rest the bullocks for a while. After putting the bullocks to rest Mahant also took a light nap. During the rest Mahant again perceived that the idol of the Lord giving him a divine direction to consecrate the place and install the idol there itself. Mahant deemed this as a divine order and installed (Predeshta) the idol at the very same place with the help of the locals.  The place is now known as Panki.  Then on the locals started worshiping the Lord Hanumanji at the installed place.  In time to come a small temple came up with the help of the locals and came to be known as Panki temple of Lord Hanuman. Now it is very popular, as even the desires perceived difficult to achieve by devotees will be fulfilled (assadhya sadhaka swamin) with the worship of Panki Hanumanji. As the fame spread around, the temple became more and more popular and now devotees from all over the country are visiting this holy shrine. At present, the Panki temple is known as one of the very famous temple of Lord Hanuman in North India. There is a power house in panki for transmission of electricity to the nearby area with this power house most of the villages are getting electricity. A residential colony for the employees of Panki power house is also there consisting of 2000 houses. A Gun factory is also there.

Train accident

The train mishap took place in Panki Railway Station, some 90 km southwest of Lucknow, when the Gorakhdham Express rammed into the Prayagraj Express on 2 January 2010.  The Prayagraj Express suffered greater casualties.

See also

 Kanpur

References

Neighbourhoods in Kanpur